The 1999 Pittsburgh Panthers football team represented the University of Pittsburgh in the 1999 NCAA Division I-A football season. The 1999 season was the final year that The Panthers played in the aging Pitt Stadium. The final game at Pitt Stadium was on November 13, 1999 when The Panthers defeated Notre Dame 37–27.

Schedule

Roster

Game notes 

 The November 13th game against Notre Dame was the final game played at Pitt Stadium.

Coaching staff

Team players drafted into the NFL

References

Pittsburgh
Pittsburgh Panthers football seasons
Pittsburgh Panthers football